The  is a river in southern Ishikawa Prefecture in the Hokuriku region of Japan. The river originates on Hakusan, the highest peak in the Hakusan National Park on the border between Ishikawa and Gifu Prefecture, and flows in a generally northern direction to the Sea of Japan. The river is used extensively for irrigation, and for the generation of hydroelectric power. The Battle of Tedorigawa was fought on the banks of the river in 1577

Dams and hydroelectric power generation

References

Rivers of Ishikawa Prefecture
Rivers of Japan